The Arnardalshamar Tunnel is a tunnel in Iceland, located in Westfjords along Route 61. It was the first manmade tunnel in Iceland and it is also the shortest. It cuts through a basalt dike known as Arnardalshamar, between Skutulsfjörður and Álftafjörður.

References

Road tunnels in Iceland
Tunnels completed in 1948
Buildings and structures in Westfjords